Malaysia competed in the 1969 Southeast Asian Peninsular Games held in Rangoon, Burma from 6 to 13 December 1969.

Medal summary

Medals by sport

Medallists

References

1969